The Ngalamu River is a river of northern Mozambique and Malawi, located to the west of Lake Amaramba.

References

Rivers of Mozambique
Rivers of Malawi